Robert More II (died 1407), of Pamber, Hampshire, was an English politician.

He was the son of John atte More of Pamber.

More was appointed High Sheriff of Hampshire for 1393–1394 and was elected a Member of Parliament for Hampshire in September 1397.

References

People from Basingstoke
High Sheriffs of Hampshire
English MPs September 1397
14th-century births
1407 deaths